Letneozersky (also Letneozerskiy, Obozersky Southeast (US)) is an former interceptor air base located 8 km (5 miles) southeast of Obozersky, Arkhangelsk Oblast, Russia. 

It was home to the 524th Interceptor Aviation Regiment (IAP) with up to 27 Mikoyan-Gurevich MiG-25 (NATO: Foxbat) interceptor aircraft based at the airfield during the 1980s. It features two major revetment areas holding over 15 aircraft each.  The base provides air defense cover for the airspace around Arkhangelsk and Plesetsk Cosmodrome, and it was subordinate to the Arkhangelsk Air Defense District.

References

Russian Air Force bases
Soviet Air Force bases
Soviet Air Defence Force bases